Rio Rancho High School is a public high school located in Rio Rancho, New Mexico, United States. It is a part of the Rio Rancho Public Schools.

History
The state rejected the proposal of Rio Rancho High School, however Intel Corp. offered to build the high school instead, which they did and leased it back at $1 per year for 30 years, and when the lease ended, Intel donated the school to a non-profit organization responsible for running the school.

It opened in 1997. Previously students in the school district at the high school level attended Albuquerque Public Schools. In April 1997 Rio Rancho High officials stated they had not yet finished development of programs for students with special needs.

In 2008, due to overcrowding, Rio Rancho Public Schools built the new V. Sue Cleveland High School, which opened in August 2009. In 2009, incoming 9th through 11th grade students who resided south of Northern Blvd began attend Rio Rancho High School and all residing north of Northern Blvd began to attend V. Sue Cleveland High School. The class of 2010 continued to attend Rio Rancho High School regardless of where they resided in Rio Rancho.

President Barack Obama hosted a Town Hall meeting at the high school on May 14, 2009 regarding credit card reform.

In popular culture

Rio Rancho High School was used as filming location for the TV series Breaking Bad and Better Call Saul, being portrayed in the shows as J. P. Wynne High School.

The campus was also used as a film location in the 2011 movie Fright Night.

Notable alumni
Chris Williams - professional football player

Footnotes

External links 
 Rio Rancho High School

Public high schools in New Mexico
Rio Rancho, New Mexico
Schools in Sandoval County, New Mexico